Wheelchair basketball has been contested in the Asian Para Games since its inception in 2010. Both men's and women's team has competed in the games.

Men's tournaments

Summaries

Per nation

Participating nations

Women's tournaments

Summaries

Per nation

Participating nations

 
Asian Para Games